No Dorai is a 2019 Bangladeshi drama film directed by Taneem Rahman Angshu. Set in Cox's Bazar, the story of No Dorai is based on the life of a young Bangladeshi girl, who defies society's norms to follow her dream of becoming a surfer. It is the first Bangladeshi surfing film. No Dorai literally means "not afraid" in Chittagonian dialect. It features Sunerah Binte Kamal and Sariful Razz in lead roles.

The film is Star Cineplex’s first venture into film production. Prior to the release of the film, its soundtrack Jontrona sung by Mohon Sharif created hype about the film. Star Cineplex’s No Dorai and Faridur Reza Sagar's Fagun Haway have jointly won the Bangladesh National Film Award for Best Film of 2019.

Cast 
The film features mostly new actors and actresses.

 Sunerah Binte Kamal as Ayesha.
 Sariful Razz as Sohel.
 Sayed Babu as Amir.
 Wasim Sitar as Liakot.
 Josefine Lindegaard as Esther.
 Tommy Hindley as Mark.
 Nasir Uddin Khan as Ayesha's Husband
 Lenka Vomocilova as Cynthia

Reception 
Despite the hype created prior to its release, No Dorai received negative critical reception. The film has been praised for its beautiful visual of Cox's Bazar and performance of newcomer cast. But the story has not been critically well received.

Awards 
Bangladesh National Film Award for Best Film of 2019. National Film Award for Best Actress of 2019 for Sunerah Binte Kamal.

References

External links 

 
 Review by Dhaka Tribune

2019 films
Bengali-language Bangladeshi films
Films shot in Chittagong Division
Films set in Bangladesh
2010s Bengali-language films
Best Film National Film Award (Bangladesh) winners
Films whose writer won the Best Screenplay National Film Award (Bangladesh)
Bangladeshi feminist films
Bangladeshi sports drama films
Films about women in Bangladesh
Films shot in Cox's Bazar
Films set in Cox's Bazar